"For What It's Worth" is the first single from Swedish band the Cardigans's fifth studio album, Long Gone Before Daylight (2003). It was released on 10 March 2003, reaching number eight in the band's native Sweden, number 31 in the United Kingdom, number 37 in Ireland, and number 98 in the Netherlands. Nicky Wire, bassist of the Manic Street Preachers, thinks this song has the best lyrics.

Track listings

Scandinavian CD single
 "For What It's Worth" – 4:16
 "The Road" – 6:50

European CD single
 "For What It's Worth" – 4:18
 "The Road" – 6:52
 "For What It's Worth" (Polar Session '01) – 4:16
 "Das Model" ('00) – 2:53

UK maxi-CD single
 "For What It's Worth" – 4:16
 "Das Model" ('00) – 2:53
 "The Road" – 6:52
 "For What It's Worth" (video—director's cut) – 4:16

UK cassette single
 "For What It's Worth" – 4:16
 "Das Model" ('00) – 2:53
 "The Road" – 6:52

Charts

Weekly charts

Year-end charts

Release history

References

2003 singles
2003 songs
The Cardigans songs
Songs written by Nina Persson
Songs written by Peter Svensson
Stockholm Records singles